Sallins  is a town in County Kildare, Ireland, situated 3.5 km north of the town centre of Naas, from which it is separated by the M7 motorway. Sallins is the anglicised name of Na Solláin which means "the willows".

In the official Central Statistics Office census of 2016, Sallins had a population of 5,849 people. The town expanded rapidly between the 2002 and 2016 censuses, almost doubling the population (from 2,922 to 5,849 people) between those years. It is the ninth largest settlement in Kildare and the 78th largest in Ireland. 
Sallins grew as a result of its position on both the Grand Canal and the Dublin to Cork railway line. Historically, the major employers in the town were Odlums Flour Mills and a meat factory, although both have now closed.

Theobald Wolfe Tone is buried near Sallins in Bodenstown graveyard. Each summer, Irish republicans of various political and paramilitary groupings congregate at Sallins to hold commemorations at Tone's grave.

Transport

The village's railway station serves both Sallins itself and neighbouring Naas, as reflected in its official name of "Sallins and Naas". Originally named just "Sallins", it opened on 4 August 1846 and was the junction for the Tullow branch, which included the original Naas station. It closed in 1963, and was renamed Sallins & Naas upon re-opening in 1994, as part of the Kildare "Arrow" commuter rail project.
A feeder bus operates between the station and the centre of Naas (Poplar Square & Post Office).
The station was also the location for Ireland's largest train robbery - the so-called "Sallins Train Robbery" - which occurred on 31 March 1976. Several hundred thousand pounds were stolen from a Córas Iompair Éireann train. Several people were tried for the robbery and jailed and the case eventually was adjudged a significant miscarriage of justice.

Sport and amenities
Sallins GAA has its grounds in the centre of the village which include a championship sized pitch, a clubhouse, and dressing rooms. The GAA club has been in existence since 1885.

The village is also home to the soccer club Sallins Celtic, and the Sallins Dramatic Society.

The canal near the village is used for fishing and boating. The Leinster Aqueduct is situated nearby, mid-way along the canal between Sallins and Caragh. This is the point where the Grand Canal crosses the River Liffey. In 2015, a passenger boat service began operating offering cruise excursions to Leinster Aqueduct and Digby Lock.

Each year since 2004 during August, the Sallins Community Festival is held which includes some local activities, including a beauty contest called 'Queen of the Waterways'.

Sallins has one national (primary) school. As of 2020, Sallins National School (also known as St Laurences National School), had over 680 pupils enrolled.

See also
List of towns and villages in Ireland

References

External links

 Sallins National School website

Towns and villages in County Kildare